is a song by Showta, released as his 6th single on April 23, 2008. The song was featured on NHK's Minna no Uta for the months of April and May 2008 to celebrate the 1000th anniversary of The Tale of Genji.

Background and release

"Hikaru no Gen-chan" is a dance song composed by Akira Senju, with lyrics written by Kenzo Saeki, for the Minna no Uta segments on NHK. The song was written to celebrate the 1000th anniversary of The Tale of Genji and was broadcast from April to May 2008. Showta performed the song, and his voice was described as having "succeeding high notes." The television segment was animated by Hiroshi Nishimura.

The single was released on April 23, 2008 under the King Records, along with "Sausage", the B-side. "Sausage", an R&B song, had previously been released on Showta's album, Eve.

Reception
"Hikaru no Gen-chan" reached #140 on the Oricon Weekly Singles Chart. CDJournal described "Hikaru no Gen-chan" as having a "unique sparkle", while "Sausage" had a warm R&B taste that made an impact with Showta's "unisex-sounding" voice.

Track listing

Charts

References

2008 singles
2008 songs
Minna no Uta
Works based on The Tale of Genji